The Institute of Russian Realist Art (IRRA) is a private institution which brings back the public and social traditions of Russian artistic patronage. The IRRA museum and exhibition centre was opened on December 1, 2011 in one of the old buildings of the former cotton-printing factory built in the "Zamoskvorechye" district of Moscow at the end of the 19th century. The IRRA art collection is widely regarded as one of the best collections of the Russian realist school of painting of the 20th century. Three floors of exhibition space totaling over 4,500 square meters offer approximately 500 works of Russian and Soviet art.

Selected collection highlights

Third floor
The halls of the third floor display one of the most important sections of the museum collection, Soviet art from the first half of the 20th century, including works by outstanding figures such as Arkady Plastov, Sergey Gerasimov, Alexander Deineka, Yury Pimenov, Georgy Nissky, Isaak Brodsky and other painters.

Second floor
The second floor of the Institute of Russian Realist Art displays the Soviet art collection of the second half of the 20th century. At its centre are works by the major painters of the 1960s including "National Artists", and full members of the Russian Academy of Arts Gely Korzhev, the brothers Sergei and Alexei Tkachev, Viktor Ivanov, Petr Ossovsky, Dmitry Zhilinsky and Tair Salakhov. The painters of this generation have continued the traditions of Russian artistic culture, and many of them, like Viktor Popkov, have dedicated their works to dramatic events in the contemporary life of Russia, with all of its difficulties and contradictions.

First floor
The halls of the first floor familiarise with present-day life in Russia, including works by such famous members of the Moscow school of painting as Viktor Kalinin, Alexei Sukhovetsky, Vladimir Telin, Nikolai Zaitsev, Vyacheslav Stekolschikov, Nikolai Solomin; the works of outstanding Leningrad painters Andrei Mylnikov, Yevsei Moiseenko, Boris Ugarov, Vyacheslav Zagonek; the artists from Vladimir, including Kim Britov, Vladimir Yukin and Mikhail Izotov. Works by artists from Kostroma, Yaroslavl, Vologda, Vyatka, Sergiev Posad, Krasnoyarsk, Nizhny Novgorod and other Russian cities are also on display.

External links
 
Institute of Russian Realist Art within Google Arts & Culture

Art museums and galleries in Moscow
Art museums established in 2011
2011 establishments in Russia